The 2019 season was the Carolina Panthers' 25th in the National Football League (NFL), and their ninth and last under head coach Ron Rivera. The Panthers played in London as part of the NFL International Series for the first time in franchise history.

Despite suffering their first 0–2 start since 2013, they had a 5–3 record coming into week 10 of the season. However, their futility from the previous year repeated itself. They suffered an eight-game losing streak (their worst since 2001, where they finished 1–15) to end the season badly with a 5–11 record. Not only were they unable to improve upon their 7–9 record from the previous season, but they were also mathematically eliminated from postseason contention for the second consecutive season and for the third time in the past four seasons after losing to the Denver Broncos in Super Bowl 50 in 2015 (they finished the season with a 15–1 record) after a 20–40 loss to division rivals Atlanta Falcons coming into Week 14 of the season. After a Week 4 win over the Jacksonville Jaguars on October 6, 2019, head coach Ron Rivera surpassed John Fox to become the franchise's winningest head coach of all time. However on December 3, two days after a loss to the Washington Redskins, Rivera was fired after nearly nine seasons as head coach and due to new ownership wanting a change within the organization. Cam Newton suffered a season-ending foot injury after playing in the first 2 weeks of the season, and was replaced by rookie quarterbacks Will Grier and Kyle Allen. On October 7, Kyle Allen became the first undrafted quarterback to win their first 4 starts since Kurt Warner did so during the St. Louis Rams' 1999 Super Bowl-winning season.

The 2019 season was also linebacker Luke Kuechly's final season in the NFL, as he retired following the conclusion of the season. It was also the final season of Cam Newton's first tenure in Carolina; he would re-sign with the team during the 2021 season.

NFL Draft

Notes
 As the result of a negative differential of free agent signings and departures that the Panthers experienced during the  free agency period, the team received one compensatory selection for the 2019 draft. Exact numbers of the selections from rounds 4–7 were determined at the NFL's annual spring owners' meetings.

Staff

Final roster

Preseason

Regular season

Schedule

Note: Intra-division opponents are in bold text.

Game summaries

Week 1: vs. Los Angeles Rams

It was a scoreless first quarter in the Panthers' home opener against the Los Angeles Rams. In the second, the Rams scored 13 points, but with two seconds to go in the half, Joey Slye made a field goal for Carolina. Early in the third, the Rams made another field goal. The Panthers answered back with a Christian McCaffrey touchdown plus a Slye field goal, making it 16–10. Towards the end of the third, the Rams scored a touchdown. Carolina followed with another field goal. At the beginning of the fourth, Carolina blocked a Rams punt and recovered it at the 5-yard line. They went on to score, making it a three-point game. Soon after, James Bradberry intercepted the ball, but they ended up having to punt it away. The Rams scored again to increase their lead to 10, before intercepting the ball from Carolina. With less than two minutes to go, Alexander Armah scored a touchdown for Carolina. Despite this, the Panthers still fell short and lost 30–27 to go 0–1.

Week 2: vs. Tampa Bay Buccaneers

For the first time since 2013, the Panthers started the season 0–2.

Week 3: at Arizona Cardinals

In Week 3, Carolina traveled to Arizona for their first road trip of the season and both teams looking for their first win. This was also Kyle Allen's first start of the season at QB. The Cardinals were first on the board with a Larry Fitzgerald touchdown, before Curtis Samuel tied the scores with a touchdown for Carolina early in the second quarter. In the last two minutes of the half, Arizona retook the lead via a field goal, before Kyle Allen threw a 52-yard touchdown pass to D. J. Moore to give the Panthers a 14–10 lead at halftime. Arizona started off with the ball in the second half, and capping a 75-yard drive, Kyler Murray completed a 3-yard pass to David Johnson for a touchdown. However, their lead was brief, as Allen threw a 3-yard touchdown pass to Greg Olsen. The Cardinals reduced their deficit to a single point on their next series, as Zane Gonzalez made a 47-yard field goal. Ray-Ray McCloud was only able to return the ensuing kickoff to the Panthers 16, but a pair of runs from Christian McCaffrey, first for eight yards and then for 76 yards, put the Panthers up by eight points going into the final period, following a Kyler Murray interception on Arizona's next possession. In the fourth quarter, Greg Olsen picked up another 3-yard touchdown catch and Joey Slye added a 36-yard field goal to give the Panthers a 38–20 win, improving them to 1–2. This game would give the Panthers franchise all-time win number 200, with both regular season and playoff record at 200-203-1 at that point.

Week 4: at Houston Texans

The Panthers defeat Houston 16–10 on the road and improve to 2–2.

Week 5: vs. Jacksonville Jaguars

The Panthers get their third straight win, improving to 3-2. This regular season win was Ron Rivera's 74th, surpassing John Fox for the most regular season wins in franchise history with a record of 74-60-1 at that point.

Week 6: at Tampa Bay Buccaneers
NFL London Games

The Panthers played in London for the first time as part of the NFL International Series. The Panthers get their fourth straight win, improving to 4-2.

Week 8: at San Francisco 49ers

The 49ers blow out the Panthers 51-13, and they fall to 4–3.

Week 9: vs. Tennessee Titans

Week 10: at Green Bay Packers

Week 11: vs. Atlanta Falcons

Week 12: at New Orleans Saints

Week 13: vs. Washington Redskins

Week 14: at Atlanta Falcons

Week 15: vs. Seattle Seahawks

Week 16: at Indianapolis Colts

Week 17: vs. New Orleans Saints

Standings

Division

Conference

References

External links
 

 2019 Camp Confidential (video series), Carolina Panthers, August 3–24, 2019.  Episode 1 | Episode 2 | Episode 3 | Episode 4

Carolina
Carolina Panthers seasons
Carolina Panthers